The 14th Canadian Parliament was the first Canadian parliament where a woman sat as a member. Women first became eligible to hold seats in the Canadian House of Commons on July 7, 1919. In the 1921 federal election, four women ran for seats in the House of Commons. Agnes Macphail was elected for a rural constituency in Ontario, becoming the first woman to hold a seat in the Canadian parliament.

Party Standings

Members of the House of Commons

References 

Lists of women politicians in Canada